Frank Edelblut is an American businessman and politician who is the Commissioner of the New Hampshire Department of Education. Edelblut formerly served as a Republican member of the New Hampshire House of Representatives.  During his term in the House, Edelblut represented Hillsborough County District 38, including the towns of Antrim, Bennington, Francestown, Greenville, Greenfield, Hancock, Hillsborough, Lyndeborough, Wilton, and Windsor. He served on the Finance Committee, Special Committee on Pensions, and the Child and Family Law Committee. He was a Republican candidate for Governor of New Hampshire in 2016, narrowly finishing second in the primary.

Education
Edelblut attended the University of Rhode Island where he earned a Bachelor of Science, Business Administration – Accounting in 1983. Edelblut also holds a Masters of Theological Studies from the Holy Cross Greek Orthodox School of Theology, 2015.

Career

Professional
Edelblut started his career as an auditor for PricewaterhouseCoopers (PwC) in South Florida (Miami, Fort Lauderdale, and West Palm Beach) where he worked as a Certified Public Accountant auditing a variety of businesses. He then briefly worked as the CFO for one of his PwC clients, Niagara Corp., In 2013, he left Common Angels and now does early-stage investing on his own.

Political
Edelblut served on the New Hampshire House of Representatives Finance Committee, Special Committee on Pensions and on the Child and Family Law committee.

Edelblut was the prime sponsor of a number of bills in 2016, including bills on net metering, freedom of speech on college campuses, arming otherwise-unarmed New Hampshire National Guard facilities, supporting the ability of members of the military to wear dress uniforms in graduation ceremonies, and several measures in the family court to try to reduce conflict in already difficult divorce proceedings.

In 2016, Edelblut announced he would not seek reelection as state representative and would instead be a Republican candidate for Governor of New Hampshire during the 2016 primary election. Edelblut ultimately lost the election to now-Governor Chris Sununu by fewer than 900 votes. The pair appeared at a joint press conference on the steps of the Capital Building the day following the election, where Edelblut endorsed Sununu.

In January 2017, Governor Chris Sununu nominated Edelblut to be the Commissioner of the New Hampshire Department of Education. Edelblut was confirmed by the Republican led New Hampshire Executive Council in February.

Personal life
Edelblut has been married for 30 years and has seven children. Five are college graduates, one is currently in college, and one is still at home. All of his children have been home educated. Edelblut also has three grandchildren.

Edelblut has competed in triathlons and Nordic ski racing, including a biathlon.

References

External links 
 Official campaign website
 BallotPedia page
 List of New Hampshire House of Representatives members

Hellenic College Holy Cross Greek Orthodox School of Theology alumni
Living people
Republican Party members of the New Hampshire House of Representatives
People from Wilton, New Hampshire
State cabinet secretaries of New Hampshire
University of Rhode Island alumni
1961 births